Dougald Campbell (14 December 1922 – 9 April 1996) was a Scottish professional footballer who played as a right winger. He died in Victoria, British Columbia, Canada in April 1996 at the age of 73.

References

1922 births
1996 deaths
Sportspeople from Kirkintilloch
Scottish footballers
Association football wingers
Queens Park Rangers F.C. players
Crewe Alexandra F.C. players
Barrow A.F.C. players
Grimsby Town F.C. players
Peterborough United F.C. players
English Football League players